The Passenger in the Straitjacket (German:Der Passagier in der Zwangsjacke) is a 1922 German silent film directed by Rudolf Walther-Fein. It was one of two German films released that year featuring the private detective character Nick Carter.

Cast
 Bruno Eichgrün as Nick Carter  
 Karl Falkenberg as Bruns  
 Rose Lichtenstein as Frau Bruns 
 Willi Allan as Lidhi  
 Arthur Bergen as Baron Mottek  
 Alfred Graening as Graf Haugk  
 Fritz Kampers as Mr. Hudson  
 Grete Sorbeck as Zofe bei Bruns

References

Bibliography
 Weniger, Kay. 'Es wird im Leben dir mehr genommen als gegeben ...' Lexikon der aus Deutschland und Österreich emigrierten Filmschaffenden 1933 bis 1945. ACABUS Verlag, 2011.

External links

1922 films
Films of the Weimar Republic
German silent feature films
Films directed by Rudolf Walther-Fein
German black-and-white films
Nick Carter (literary character)